Military administration identifies both the techniques and systems used by military departments, agencies, and armed services involved in managing the armed forces. It describes the processes that take place within military organisations outside combat, particularly in managing military personnel, their training, and services they are provided with as part of their military service. In many ways military administration serves the same role as public administration in the civil society, and is often cited as a source of bureaucracy in the government as a whole. Given the wide area of application, military administration is often qualified by specific areas of application within the military, such as logistics administration, administration of doctrine development or military reform administration.

Citations and notes

References
 Weber, Jeffrey A., Eliasson, Johan, Handbook of Military Administration, CRC Press, 2007

Military organization